Cnemidolophus is a genus of moths in the family Cosmopterigidae. It contains only one species, Cnemidolophus lavernellus, which is found in Kenya, South Africa, Tanzania and Gambia.

References

Antequerinae
Monotypic moth genera
Moths of Africa